Tetrahedrane is a hypothetical platonic hydrocarbon with chemical formula  and a tetrahedral structure. The molecule would be subject to considerable angle strain and has not been synthesized as of 2021.  However, a number of derivatives have been prepared.  In a more general sense, the term tetrahedranes is used to describe a class of molecules and ions with related structure, e.g. white phosphorus.

Organic tetrahedranes
In 1978, Günther Maier prepared tetra-tert-butyl-tetrahedrane. These bulky substituents envelop the tetrahedrane core. Maier suggested that bonds in the core are prevented from breaking because this would force the substituents closer together (corset effect) resulting in Van der Waals strain. Tetrahedrane is one of the possible platonic hydrocarbons and has the IUPAC name tricyclo[1.1.0.02,4]butane.

Unsubstituted tetrahedrane remains elusive, although it is predicted to be kinetically stable. One strategy that has been explored (but thus far failed) is reaction of propene with atomic carbon. Locking away a tetrahedrane molecule inside a fullerene has only been attempted in silico. Due to its bond strain and stoichiometry, tetranitrotetrahedrane has potential as a high-performance energetic material (explosive). Some properties have been calculated based on quantum chemical methods.

Tetra-tert-butyltetrahedrane
This compound was first synthesised starting from a cycloaddition of an alkyne with t-Bu substituted maleic anhydride, followed by rearrangement with carbon dioxide expulsion to a cyclopentadienone and its bromination, followed by addition of the fourth t-Bu group.  Photochemical cheletropic elimination of carbon monoxide of the cyclopentadienone gives the target. Heating tetra-tert-butyltetrahedrane gives tetra-tert-butylcyclobutadiene.  Though the synthesis appears short and simple, by Maier's own account, it took several years of careful observation and optimization to develop the correct conditions for the challenging reactions to take place.  For instance, the synthesis of tetrakis(t-butyl)cyclopentadienone from the tris(t-butyl)bromocyclopentadienone (itself synthesized with much difficulty) required over 50 attempts before working conditions could be found.  The synthesis was described as requiring "astonishing persistence and experimental skill" in one retrospective of the work.  In a classic reference work on stereochemistry, the authors remark that "the relatively straightforward scheme shown [...] conceals both the limited availability of the starting material and the enormous amount of work required in establishing the proper conditions for each step." 

Eventually, a more scalable synthesis was conceived, in which the last step was the photolysis of a cyclopropenyl-substituted diazomethane, which affords the desired product through the intermediacy of tetrakis(tert-butyl)cyclobutadiene:  This approach took advantage of the observation that the tetrahedrane and the cyclobutadiene could be interconverted (uv irradiation in the forward direction, heat in the reverse direction).

Tetrakis(trimethylsilyl)tetrahedrane

Tetrakis(trimethylsilyl)tetrahedrane can be prepared by treatment of the cyclobutadiene precursor with tris(pentafluorophenyl)borane and is far more stable than the tert-butyl analogue. The silicon–carbon bond is longer than a carbon–carbon bond, and therefore the corset effect is reduced. Whereas the tert-butyl tetrahedrane melts at 135 °C concomitant with rearrangement to the cyclobutadiene, tetrakis(trimethylsilyl)tetrahedrane, which melts at 202 °C, is stable up to 300 °C, at which point it cracks to bis(trimethylsilyl)acetylene. 

The tetrahedrane skeleton is made up of banana bonds, and hence the carbon atoms are high in s-orbital character. From NMR, sp-hybridization can be deduced, normally reserved for triple bonds. As a consequence the bond lengths are unusually short with 152 picometers.

Reaction with methyllithium with tetrakis(trimethylsilyl)tetrahedrane yields tetrahedranyllithium. Coupling reactions with this lithium compound gives extended structures.

A bis(tetrahedrane) has also been reported. The connecting bond is even shorter with 143.6 pm. An ordinary carbon–carbon bond has a length of 154 pm.

Tetrahedranes with non-carbon cores
In tetrasilatetrahedrane features a core of four silicon atoms. The standard silicon–silicon bond is much longer (235 pm) and the cage is again enveloped by a total of 16 trimethylsilyl groups, which confer stability. The silatetrahedrane can be reduced with potassium graphite to the tetrasilatetrahedranide potassium derivative. In this compound one of the silicon atoms of the cage has lost a silyl substituent and carries a negative charge. The potassium cation can be sequestered by a crown ether, and in the resulting complex potassium and the silyl anion are separated by a distance of 885 pm. One of the Si−–Si bonds is now 272 pm and its silicon atom has an inverted tetrahedral geometry. Furthermore, the four cage silicon atoms are equivalent on the NMR timescale due to migrations of the silyl substituents over the cage.

The dimerization reaction observed for the carbon tetrahedrane compound is also attempted for a tetrasilatetrahedrane. In this tetrahedrane the cage is protected by four so-called supersilyl groups in which a silicon atom has 3 tert-butyl substituents. The dimer does not materialize but a reaction with iodine in benzene followed by reaction with the tri-tert-butylsilaanion results in the formation of an eight-membered silicon cluster compound which can be described as a  dumbbell (length 229 pm and with inversion of tetrahedral geometry) sandwiched between two almost-parallel  rings.

In eight-membered clusters of in the same carbon group, tin  and germanium  the cluster atoms are located on the corners of a cube.

Inorganic and organometallic tetrahedranes

The tetrahedrane motif occurs broadly in chemistry.  White phosphorus (P4) and yellow arsenic (As4) are examples. Several metal carbonyl clusters are referred to as tetrahedranes, e.g. tetrarhodium dodecacarbonyl.

Metallatetrahedranes with a single metal (or phosphorus atom) capping a cyclopropyl trianion also exist.

See also
Dodecahedrane
Prismane
Prismane

References 

Cycloalkanes
Cluster chemistry
Hypothetical chemical compounds
Tricyclic compounds